The Woodside station is a station on the Main Line and Port Washington Branch of the Long Island Rail Road (LIRR), located in the Woodside neighborhood of Queens in New York City. It is the first station passed by eastward trains from Penn Station and Grand Central Madison, and it is the only station in Queens shared by the Port Washington Branch and other LIRR branches. East of Woodside the two-track Port Washington Branch turns eastward, while the four-track Main Line continues southeast to Jamaica station. 

Woodside has six tracks and three platforms. The four southernmost tracks passing through the station are the Main Line tracks; the two center tracks on the Main Line are through (express) tracks and do not have platform faces at Woodside. The two northernmost tracks are the Port Washington branch tracks, both of which have platforms. West of the station, the line merges with Amtrak's Hell Gate Bridge access tracks (part of the Northeast Corridor) at Harold Interlocking before entering the East River Tunnels or 63rd Street Tunnel to Manhattan. The 61st Street–Woodside station is above Woodside station, on a viaduct high above Roosevelt Avenue. At street level, the Q70 SBS bus provides limited-stop service to LaGuardia Airport. The station is ADA-accessible via elevators and ramps.

History

Woodside originally had two railroad stations. One was built in 1861 on 60th Street by the LIRR subsidiary New York and Jamaica Railroad; the other, larger station was built by the Flushing and North Side Railroad on November 15, 1869, and was the first to be built by the F&NS after acquiring the troubled New York and Flushing Railroad.

For a short period during the 1870s, it served not only the Port Washington Branch but also the Woodside Branch. The Woodside Branch ran across northwestern Queens, had one station at Junction Boulevard and 35th Avenue, and took commuters either to the former Whitestone Branch or to what is today Corona Yard. Like all other stations on Long Island, it was acquired by the Long Island Railroad in 1876, but in this case the former LIRR-built station was abandoned. 

Though the line was electrified on June 16, 1910, the station was closed in 1914 due to a grade elimination project and razed on November 17, 1915. The existing elevated station was opened on October 17, 1915. When Winfield station was closed in 1929, Woodside became the easternmost station served by both Main Line and Port Washington Branch trains (and thus also a transfer point) before the split at Winfield Junction. 

On March 17, 1936, at a hearing of the New York State Transit Commission and the New York State Public Service Commission, the LIRR said that it would seek permission in 1937 to abandon the three stations along the Main Line between Jamaica and Pennsylvania Station—Kew Gardens, Forest Hills, and Woodside. The LIRR had said that it anticipated a loss of annual revenue between $750,000 and $1 million with the opening of the extension of the Independent Subway System's Queens Boulevard Line to Jamaica.

The station underwent a renovation and became ADA-accessible in the 1990s, during which time the platforms were extended to accommodate 12-car trains. The renovated station was designed by Urbahn Architects. 

In 2006, an 18-year-old woman died after falling into the gap between the platform and train, and subsequently getting hit by an oncoming passenger train. The death resulted in the LIRR and Metro-North Railroad implementing an aggressive platform gap mitigation platform conductor personnel, and "Watch the gap" programs.

Station layout

This station has three 12-car long high-level platforms. The northern one, a side platform (Platform C) next to Track 1 of the Port Washington Branch, is generally used by westbound or Manhattan-bound trains. The central one, an island platform (Platform B) between Track 2 of the Port Washington Branch and Track 3 of the Main Line, is generally used by eastbound or outbound Port Washington trains and westbound or Manhattan-bound Main Line trains. The southern one, a side platform (Platform A) next to Track 4 of the Main Line, is generally used by outbound or eastbound Main Line trains. 

There are six tracks. Tracks 1 and 2 of the Main Line, which are not adjacent to any platform, are used by non-stopping trains.

References

External links

 Unofficial LIRR History website
 Woodside Station and IRT Flushing Line view
 Port Washington Branch with Main Line in the background
 61st Street entrance from Google Maps Street View
 Platforms from Google Maps Street View

Long Island Rail Road stations in New York City
Railway stations in Queens, New York
Railway stations in the United States opened in 1869
Woodside, Queens
1869 establishments in New York (state)